The 1970 Troy State Red Wave football team represented Troy State University (now known as Troy University) as a member of the Mid-South Athletic Conference (MSAC) during the 1970 NAIA Division I football season. Led by fifth-year head coach Billy Atkins, the Red Wave compiled an overall record of 6–4–1 with a mark of 3–2 in conference play, placing third in the MSAC.

Schedule

References

Troy State
Troy Trojans football seasons
Troy State Trojans football